The Beaver Relief Society Meetinghouse, located at 35 N. 1st East in Beaver, Utah, was built in 1896.  It has served as a religious structure, a meeting hall, and a civic building. Since 1977, it has served as Beaver's fire station.

It is a tallish building made of tuff (pink rock) that was built for the Beaver Relief Society, the women's organization of the Church of Jesus Christ of Latter-day Saints.  It was listed on the National Register of Historic Places (NHRP) in 1983.

It is a different building from the Beaver Relief Society's Meeting Hall, which is located nearby and which is also on the NHRP.

References

Properties of religious function on the National Register of Historic Places in Utah
Buildings and structures completed in 1896
Buildings and structures in Beaver County, Utah
National Register of Historic Places in Beaver County, Utah
19th-century Latter Day Saint church buildings
Relief Society buildings